Jože Klemenčič (born 3 June 1962) is a Slovenian cross-country skier. He competed in the men's 15 kilometre event at the 1984 Winter Olympics.

References

1962 births
Living people
Slovenian male cross-country skiers
Olympic cross-country skiers of Yugoslavia
Cross-country skiers at the 1984 Winter Olympics
Skiers from Ljubljana